Giuliano Peixoto (born 29 September 1975) is a Brazilian table tennis player. He competed in the men's doubles event at the 1996 Summer Olympics.

References

External links
 

1975 births
Living people
Brazilian male table tennis players
Olympic table tennis players of Brazil
Table tennis players at the 1996 Summer Olympics
People from Americana, São Paulo
Sportspeople from São Paulo (state)
20th-century Brazilian people